Carlos Pigem (born 6 July 1990) is a Spanish professional golfer.

Pigem has played on the Asian Tour since 2013. He picked up his first victory in 2016 at the Yeangder Tournament Players Championship.

Amateur wins
this list may be incomplete
2011 Campeonato de Catalunya Junior
2012 Campeonato de Barcelona, Campeonato de Catalunya Absoluto, Campeonato de Canarias, World University Championship, Campeonato De Espana Amateur

Source:

Professional wins (1)

Asian Tour wins (1)

Asian Tour playoff record (1–0)

Team appearances
Amateur
Jacques Léglise Trophy (representing the Continent of Europe): 2008
European Amateur Team Championship (representing Spain): 2008, 2009, 2010
Bonallack Trophy (representing Europe): 2010 (canceled)
Eisenhower Trophy (representing Spain): 2012 
St Andrews Trophy (representing the Continent of Europe): 2012 (winners)

See also
2019 European Tour Qualifying School graduates

References

External links

Spanish male golfers
Golfers from Catalonia
Asian Tour golfers
Sportspeople from Lleida
Sportspeople from Barcelona
1990 births
Living people
20th-century Spanish people
21st-century Spanish people